You Don't Know Me is an album by saxophonist Thomas Chapin which was recorded in 1994 and released on the Arabesque label the following year.

Reception

The AllMusic review by Scott Yanow said "Throughout this well-rounded CD, Thomas Chapin (who switches between alto, soprano and flute) is in superb form ... the album is recommended primarily for the exuberant and consistently creative playing of Chapin, a rapidly emerging talent who deserves much more recognition".

Track listing
All compositions by Thomas Chapin except where noted
 "Safari Notebook: Izzit?" – 9:29
 "Safari Notebook: Kaokoland" – 6:06
 "Safari Notebook: Kunene" – 7:20
 "Safari Notebook: Opuwo" – 9:46
 "Safari Notebook: Namibian Sunset" – 8:28
 "Kura Kura" – 5:36
 "Goodbye" (Gordon Jenkins) – 8:19
 "You Don't Know Me" (Cindy Walker, Eddy Arnold) – 7:01

Personnel
Thomas Chapin – alto saxophone, mezzo-soprano saxophone, flute
Tom Harrell – trumpet, flugelhorn
Peter Madsen – piano
Kiyoto Fujiwara – double bass
Reggie Nicholson – drums

References

Arabesque Records albums
Thomas Chapin albums
1995 albums